Gone Away is an EP by Die Kreuzen, released in 1989 through Touch and Go Records.

Track listing

Personnel 
Die Kreuzen
Keith Brammer – bass guitar
Brian Egeness – guitar, piano
Dan Kubinski – vocals
Erik Tunison – drums
Production and additional personnel
Die Kreuzen – production, mixing
Richard Kohl – illustrations
Bill Stace – mixing
Butch Vig – production, engineering, mixing
Randy Zorn – engineering

References

External links 
 

1989 EPs
Albums produced by Butch Vig
Die Kreuzen albums
Touch and Go Records EPs